Addis Ababa Fistula Hospital, also known as AAFH and Hamlin Fistula Hospital, is a women's health care hospital based in Addis Ababa, Ethiopia.  The hospital was founded by Australian physicians Catherine Hamlin and Reginald Hamlin, to care for women with childbirth injuries.  It is the only hospital of its kind dedicated exclusively to treating women with obstetric fistula, a condition in the developing world where maternal health provisions are poor. All patients are treated free of charge. 

Patients undergo surgical repair by surgeons trained at the hospital's main facility in Addis Ababa. Around 93% of patients are successfully treated.

History and founding
In 1958, Catherine and Reginald Hamlin answered an advertisement in The Lancet for an obstetrician and gynaecologist to establish a midwifery school at the Princess Tsehay Hospital in Addis Ababa. They arrived in Addis Ababa in 1959 on a three-year contract with the Ethiopian government, but only trained about 10 midwives when the government closed the midwifery school. The Hamlins had never seen an obstetric fistula before, but after treating many such cases at the school, they decided to build and run a dedicated hospital.

Obstetric fistula was virtually eradicated in the developed world by the 20th century due to improved obstetric techniques such as Caesarean section. The Hamlins studied the works of earlier fistula surgeons such as J. Marion Sims and methods currently in use by physicians in Egypt. 

The hospital opened in 1974. The Hamlins refined the surgical technique to close an obstetric fistula while continuing to treat a broad range of obstetric cases. Initially, word of mouth was the primary means by which patients discovered the hospital. From the first year of operations to the second in 1975, the number of patients treated increased from 30 to 300. Treatments include physiotherapy, stress incontinence management, specific treatment for stoma patients, psychological counselling, extended medical care and general education.

Development
In 1998, the hospital was extensively refurbished and enlarged. As of 2018, it can accommodate up to 140 patients and four operations can be performed simultaneously in the theatre. Five regional fistula centres have been established in the towns of Bahir Dar, Mekelle, Harar, Yirgalem, and Metu. The Hamlin Fistula hospitals are staffed by over 550 Ethiopians. All 6 hospitals provide a safe birthing facility where former patients who become pregnant again can have a caesarian section. The regional Hamlin Fistula centres provide care for women who suffer from incontinence, physical impairment, shame and marginalisation as a result of an obstetric fistula. 

The Hamlin College of Midwives was established in 2006 to ensure that there is a skilled birth attendant available to provide maternal health care (pre-, intro- and post-natal). The college follows the curriculum of the International Confederation of Midwives, including the precondition that students conduct at least 40 deliveries before they graduate.  The midwifery college is on land adjacent to Desta Mender ("Village of Joy"), where women with long-term injuries caused by obstructed labour reside, about 17 km from Addis Ababa. The first students graduated in 2011 and, as of 2018, 125 midwives have graduated with a Bachelor of Science degree in Midwifery.  All have committed to working as a Hamlin midwife for a minimum of 4 years. The midwives are being  deployed in pairs near medical centres.  In 2017, Hamlin-trained midwives delivered over 22,500 babies and no cases of fistula occurred in these births. 

The Addis Ababa hospital has trained 28 surgeons in fistula repair between 2015 an 2018. Hamlin says that they have "now treated 55,000 [women] and these are like ambassadors all over the countryside". In 2008, when the fourth clinic was opened Hamlin travelled the world to raise awareness of the effect of the condition on women in Ethiopia.

The hospitals aim to cure 4000 women annually, but Hamlin cited the World Health Organisation's estimate that there are 6000-7000 cases a year in Ethiopia alone. 

Due to the development of the five regional Hamlin Fistula Centers, some of the women who suffer the long-term effects of obstetric fistula are able to move back to their homes and receive ongoing medical care. Additionally, some women have established small businesses that have enabled them to move out of Desta Mender to nearby towns and return to receive medical care or visit friends.

The network of Hamlin Fistula Hospitals and the midwifery college are supported largely by private donors in Australia, the UK and the United States. The largest of the dedicated support organisations is the Fistula Foundation, located in San Jose, California. Money is also provided by World Vision, the Catherine Hamlin Fistula Foundation, England-based Ethiopiaid and funds paid into an endowment by the Australian Government.

Oprah Winfrey Show
In January 2004, Catherine Hamlin appeared on The Oprah Winfrey Show to discuss the 50 years of free reconstructive surgery that she has been providing to over 25,000 patients. After Hamlin's visit to the show, thousands of viewers were compelled to act due to her sheer selflessness. The Fistula Foundation, which supports Dr. Hamlin's hospital, received more than $3 million in donations. Oprah Winfrey was so impressed by Hamlin's actions that she visited the hospital in Ethiopia to tape the second episode in December 2005. The funding received by the hospital following this exposure led to the building a brand new facility with classrooms, examination rooms, housing for residents who travel to the hospital for treatment and a small apartment for the on-call doctors for Desta Mender.

See also
 Terrewode Women’s Community Hospital, Uganda

References

External links

 Addis Ababa Fistula Hospital homepage
 Catherine Hamlin Fistula Foundation in Australia
Hamlin Fistula UK

Hospitals in Ethiopia
Women's hospitals
Fistula Hospital